Eugène Buttigieg (born 1961) is a Maltese judge on the General Court of the European Union.

References 

Living people
1961 births
Maltese judges of international courts and tribunals
Place of birth missing (living people)
Date of birth missing (living people)
20th-century Maltese people
21st-century Maltese people
20th-century judges
21st-century judges
General Court (European Union) judges